Alberta Odell Jones (November 12, 1930 – August 5, 1965) was an African-American attorney and civil rights icon. She was one of the first African-American women to pass the Kentucky bar and the first woman appointed city attorney in Jefferson County. She was murdered by an unknown person.

Family 
Jones was born in Louisville, Kentucky on November 12, 1930 to Odell and Sarah (Sadie) Crawford Jones.

Education 
Jones graduated from Louisville Central High School in 1948. She then attend Louisville Municipal College (LMC), which later merged with the University of Louisville during desegregation. Jones graduated third in her class. She attended the University of Louisville Law School for one year, transferring to Howard University School of Law for her degree, graduating fourth in her class in 1959.

Career and activism 
In 1959, upon admission to the Kentucky bar the same year she received her law degree, Jones became Kentucky's first practicing African American female attorney. 

In 1960, She eventually took on a prominent client early in her career, a young boxer who later changed his name from Cassius Clay to Muhammed Ali, introducing him to trainer Archie Moore of California. She was appointed in February 1965 to the Louisville Domestic Relations Court, where she was a prosecutor.

Activism 
Jones was active in the civil rights movement, taking part in protest marches in Louisville and attending the March on Washington in August 1963. Upon returning from Washington she formed the Independent Voters Association of Louisville and was very involved with the Louisville chapter of the Urban League. She rented voting machines and taught African Americans how to use the machines to vote. She was also active in the National Association for the Advancement of Colored People. Another of her causes was a fundraising effort to pay the medical bills of a young man, James "Bulky" Welch, who lost his arms saving his dog trapped under a train, purchasing him prosthetic arms by auctioning a car.

Unsolved murder
On August 5, 1965, Jones was murdered. Her killing was first attributed to drowning and her body was retrieved from the Ohio River. However, her car was found several blocks from the Sherman Minton Bridge with blood inside and a subsequent autopsy determined that she had been subjected to several severe blows to the head before entering the water.

The follow-up police investigation determined that she had been beaten unconscious with a brick and witnesses recalled seeing a body tossed by three unidentified men from the bridge, where her purse was later found.

In 2017, efforts were made to reopen the Jones case and it became a cause célèbre. Detectives involved in the initial investigation were interviewed in the hope that new leads had surfaced over the 52 years since the killing. Professor and attorney Lee Remington, who was doing research for a biography, found clues to the murder and sent a letter to the Louisville police, who agreed to reopen the case. The civil rights division of the Department of Justice also began an investigation. The investigation is funded by a new law, the Emmett Till Unsolved Civil Rights Crime Act, which provides $13.5 million annual funds to the Department of Justice, the Federal Bureau of Investigation, and state and local law enforcement agencies to investigate and prosecute pre-1970 killings. Her killing remains unsolved.

Legacy 
In October, 2022, Louisville Central High School presented the first ever Alberta O. Jones award to Laura Rothstein, a retired University of Louisville law professor who helped start the high school's law and government magnet program. The award, which may not be given annually, is said to be intended for "those who have worked as hard as Jones to make their community a better place."

See also
List of unsolved murders

References

1930 births
1965 deaths
1965 in Kentucky
1965 murders in the United States
20th-century African-American women
20th-century African-American people
20th-century American lawyers
20th-century American women lawyers
African-American women lawyers
African-American lawyers
American prosecutors
August 1965 events in the United States
Civil rights movement
Female murder victims
Howard University School of Law alumni
Jefferson County, Kentucky
People murdered in Kentucky
Nation of Islam
People from Louisville, Kentucky
Political violence in the United States
Racially motivated violence in the United States
Terrorist incidents in the United States in 1965
Unsolved murders in the United States
History of women in Kentucky